Aleppo is a city in Syria.

Aleppo may also refer to:

Places
 Aleppo International Airport
 Aleppo International Stadium
 Citadel of Aleppo, a medieval ruin
 University of Aleppo, a public university founded in 1958

Regions
 Aleppo Governorate, a province of modern Syria
 Yamhad, a kingdom centered on Halab (Aleppo) between 19th–16th centuries BC
 Emirate of Aleppo, various principalities including
 Hamdanid dynasty, during the Abbasid Caliphate
 Mirdasid dynasty, during the Fatimid Caliphate
 Zengid dynasty, under the Seljuk Empire
 Sultanate of Aleppo, another name for the Ayyubid Empire following the loss of Egypt to the Mamluks
 Aleppo Eyalet, a province of the Ottoman Empire from 1534 to 1864
 Aleppo Vilayet, a province of the Ottoman Empire from 1866 to 1918
 State of Aleppo, a League of Nations mandate from 1920 to 1925

United States
 Aleppo Township, Allegheny County, Pennsylvania
 Aleppo Township, Greene County, Pennsylvania
 Aleppo Shrine Auditorium, a Shriner arena in Wilmington, Massachusetts, US

Books
 Aleppo: The Rise and Fall of Syria's Great Merchant City

See also
 Great Mosque of Aleppo (13th century)
 Central Synagogue of Aleppo
 Siege of Aleppo (disambiguation)
 Aleppo Pine (Pinus halepensis), a kind of tree
 Aleppo Codex, the oldest complete manuscript of the Masoretic Hebrew Bible
 Aleppo pepper
 Aleppo boil, another name for cutaneous leishmaniasis, a disease
 Aleppo room, a beautiful room from Aleppo now in the Pergamon Museum
 Aleppo soap, a traditional vegetable oil soap